Samuel Woodforde  (29 March 1763 – 27 July 1817) was a British painter.

Life
Woodforde was born at Castle Cary, Somerset. He was the second son of Heighes Woodforde, an accountant of Ansford, and his wife Anne. He was a lineal descendant of the painter Samuel Woodford, and nephew of the diarist, James Woodforde. He was supported by the banker Henry Hoare of Stourhead, Wiltshire and his family. On 8 March 1782, he became a student at the Royal Academy Schools and started exhibiting pictures in 1784. He contributed no less than 133 pictures to the Royal Academy  and 39 at the British Institution.

Richard Hoare granted Woodforde £100 a year, which allowed him to travel to Italy in 1786. He spent most of his time in Rome, studying the works of Raphael, Michelangelo, and Paolo Veronese. He also visited Venice and Florence before returning to London in 1791. Between 1792 and 1815, "he exhibited constantly, showing portraits, scenes of Italian life, historical pictures, and subjects from literature". Many of his literary pictures were engraved, such as a scene from Titus Andronicus by Anker Smith for the Boydell Shakespeare edition (1805) and several other scenes for Longmans Shakespeare (1805–7). Woodforde became an associate of the Royal Academy in 1800 and a full member in 1807.

On 7 October 1815 he married Jane Gardner; that year the couple left for Italy. Two years later, Woodforde died of fever at Bologna where he is buried in the cemetery of La Certosa.

Notes

References
Dodgson, Campbell and Tina Fiske. "Samuel Woodforde". Oxford Dictionary of National Biography. Oxford University Press. 2004. Retrieved on 8 February 2008.

External links

 

1763 births
1817 deaths
18th-century English painters
English male painters
19th-century English painters
People from South Somerset (district)
Royal Academicians
19th-century English male artists
18th-century English male artists